Braam du Toit (born 25 February 1981) is a South African composer and choral conductor. He is the recipient of a number of accolades, including a South African Film and Television Award and a Naledi Theatre Award. His film scores include The Endless River (2015), Sew the Winter to My Skin (2018), and Moffie (2019).

Early life
Du Toit grew up in Swellendam, a town in the Overberg region of the Western Cape, where he attended Swellendam High School and lives to this day. He composed his first piece of music at 16. He studied composition with Peter Klatzow at the University of Cape Town. He received the Priaulx Rainier Award for composition in 2001.

Artistry
Du Toit has cited John Tavener, Hildegard von Bingen, Michael Nyman, Meredith Monk, Claudio Monteverdi, Antonio Vivaldi, and Steve Martland among his influences. He stated he has "always been interested in combining music with other art forms," and that he finds "the reciprocal influence between music, visuals and performance intriguing and exciting."

Works

Ensemble

Filmography

Awards and nominations

Notes

References

External links

Living people
1981 births
Choral conductors
South African LGBT musicians
People from Swellendam
South African film score composers
South African opera composers